Upgrading is the process of replacing a product with a newer version of the same product. In computing and consumer electronics an upgrade is generally a replacement of hardware, software or firmware with a newer or better version, in order to bring the system up to date or to improve its characteristics.

Computing and consumer electronics
Examples of common hardware upgrades include installing additional memory (RAM), adding larger hard disks, replacing microprocessor cards or graphics cards, and installing new versions of software. Many other upgrades are possible as well.

Common software upgrades include changing the version of an operating system, of an office suite, of an anti-virus program, or of various other tools.

Common firmware upgrades include the updating of the iPod control menus, the Xbox 360 dashboard, or the non-volatile flash memory that contains the embedded operating system for a consumer electronics device.

Users can often download software and firmware upgrades from the Internet. Often the download is a patch—it does not contain the new version of the software in its entirety, just the changes that need to be made. Software patches usually aim to improve functionality or solve problems with security. Rushed patches can cause more harm than good and are therefore sometimes regarded with skepticism for a short time after release. Patches are generally free.

A software or firmware upgrade can be major or minor and the release version code-number increases accordingly. A major upgrade will change the version number, whereas a minor update will often append a ".01", ".02", ".03", etc. For example, "version 10.03" might designate the third minor upgrade of version 10. In commercial software, the minor upgrades (or updates) are generally free, but the major versions must be purchased.

Companies usually make software upgrades for the following reasons: 1.) to support industry regulatory requirements 2.) to access emerging technologies with new features, and tools 3.) to meet the demands of changing markets 4.) to continue to receive comprehensive product support.

Risks
Although developers usually produce upgrades in order to improve a product, there are risks involved—including the possibility that the upgrade will worsen the product.

Upgrades of hardware involve a risk that new hardware will not be compatible with other pieces of hardware in a system. For example, an upgrade of RAM may not be compatible with existing RAM in a computer. Other hardware components may not be compatible after either an upgrade or downgrade, due to the non-availability of compatible drivers for the hardware with a specific operating system. Conversely, there is the same risk of non-compatibility when software is upgraded or downgraded for previously functioning hardware to no longer function.

Upgrades of software introduce the risk that the new version (or patch) will contain a bug, causing the program to malfunction in some way or not to function at all. For example, in October 2005, a glitch in a software upgrade caused trading on the Tokyo Stock Exchange to shut down for most of the day. Similar   have occurred: from important government systems
to freeware on the internet.

Upgrades can also worsen a product subjectively. A user may prefer an older version even if a newer version functions perfectly as designed. This may happen for a variety of reasons, including the user being already accustomed to the behavior of the old version or because the upgrade removed some features (see iPhone jack removal controversy or  OtherOS).

A further risk of software upgrades is that they can brick the device being upgraded, such as if power fails while the upgrade is in the middle of being installed. This is an especially big concern for embedded devices, in which upgrades are typically all-or-nothing (the upgrade is a firmware or filesystem image, which isn't usable if it's only partially written), and which have limited ability to recover from a failed upgrade. Solutions to this generally involve keeping multiple copies of firmware, so that one can be upgraded while the other remains intact as a backup, but there are still holes which can cause this to fail. Tools such as Mender.io, Sysup, SWUpdate, RAUC, and OSTree provide more complete solutions that implement upgrades in a safe atomic way, and reduce or eliminate the need to customize bootloaders and other components. Desktop systems are more likely to use something like snapshots or restore points; these are more efficient as they only require a small fraction of space to store the changes from the old system to the new one, but the lack of a turnkey implementation for embedded systems makes this impractical.

See also 

Adaptation kit upgrade
Advanced Packaging Tool
Macintosh Processor Upgrade Card
Source upgrade
Windows Anytime Upgrade
Yellow dog Updater, Modified

References 

Computing terminology